The Angry Birds Movie 2 is a 2019 computer-animated action comedy film based on Rovio Entertainment's Angry Birds video game series, co-produced by Columbia Pictures, Sony Pictures Animation, and Rovio Animation, and distributed by Sony Pictures Releasing. The sequel to The Angry Birds Movie (2016), the film was directed by Thurop Van Orman (in his directorial debuts) and co-directed by John Rice from a screenplay by Peter Ackerman, Eyal Podell and Jonathon E. Stewart. Jason Sudeikis, Josh Gad, Danny McBride, Maya Rudolph, Tony Hale, Anthony Padilla, Bill Hader, and Peter Dinklage reprise their roles from the first film, with newcomers Leslie Jones, Rachel Bloom, Awkwafina, Sterling K. Brown, Eugenio Derbez, Tiffany Haddish, JoJo Siwa, and Brooklynn Prince joining the ensemble cast. In the film, birds Red (Sudeikis), Chuck (Gad), Bomb (McBride), and Sliver (Bloom), are forced to team up with pigs Leonard (Hader), Courtney (Awkwafina), and Garry (Brown) to foil plans by Zeta (Jones) and the rest of the eagles on Eagle Island when an advanced giant ice ball weapon threatens both of their Islands.

Production on a sequel to The Angry Birds Movie began in August 2016. New ideas for the film were conceived with the premise being that the birds and pigs work together to save themselves, which very rarely happens in most Angry Birds games. New characters for the film were announced in March 2019 along with new cast members. The animators were tasking with attempting create more realistic feather systems for the Birds' plumage and designing visual effects for snow, ice, water and lava for the film. Heitor Pereira returned to compose the film's score with artists such as Kesha and Luke Combs contributing tracks for the film. It also features eighteen classical pop songs from the 1960s to 2000s decades from famous artists and different genres from the soundtrack, like the first film.

The Angry Birds Movie 2 was theatrically released on August 2, 2019, in the United Kingdom and Ireland, in the Finland on August 7, and in the United States on August 14 in RealD 3D formats. The film was not as successful as its predecessor, only grossing $152.8 million on a $65 million budget, but received generally positive reviews from critics for its voice performances and humor, with many considering it an improvement over its predecessor.

Plot 
Three years after the events of the first film, Red protects Bird Island from the pigs, led by King Leonard Mudbeard, who are in a prank war against the birds. One day, a giant ice ball from nearby Eagle Island hits the sea near Piggy Island, forcing the pigs to seek a permanent truce with the birds. Zeta, the leader of Eagle Island, is angry with her frozen surroundings and wants to occupy the two islands by shooting ice balls from a super-weapon to force their inhabitants to evacuate. Red's two best friends, Chuck and Bomb, surprise Red and ask him to join them in a speed dating activity, where Red meets Chuck's sister Silver, an engineering student, who deems Red incompatible. Meanwhile, Zoe - the daughter of Red, Chuck, and Bomb's anger management teacher Matilda and their classmate Terence - loses the eggs containing her unborn sisters, so she and her friends, Vincent and Samantha, try to recover the eggs through the course of the film. 

Leonard visits Red and convinces him to form an alliance. They recruit Chuck, Bomb, Silver, Mighty Eagle, and Leonard's new assistant Courtney. A meeting in Mighty Eagle's cave gets disrupted when an ice ball from Zeta's super-weapon hits Eagle Mountain, which alarms the other birds living on Bird Island. As the team, now joined by pig gadgeteer Garry, travels to Eagle Island by submarine, Red assures the other birds that they do not need to evacuate. Once there, Mighty Eagle confesses that Zeta was once his fiancée but he abandoned her due to cowardice before he flies away. Red insists on fighting alone but Silver decides to follow him instead. They intrude the base from the mouth of the weapon, only to be captured and frozen to inflatable water toys. Zeta tells them her plan to fire ice balls filled with lava at both islands, and demonstrates her newly upgraded cannon. Red, regretting not telling the birds to evacuate, admits his wish to be liked by everyone to Silver, who comforts him and frees them both. Meanwhile, the other team members disguise themselves as an eagle and grab a key card to get into the base, where they reunite with Red and Silver. 

Red gives up leadership to Silver, who establishes a plan to destroy the cannon as it begins to load up ammunition in ten minutes for the actual attack on both islands. Red and Silver put themselves inside an ice ball and roll it down the spiraling ammunition track of Zeta's cannon, while Chuck and Bomb distract the eagles and the three pigs work to sever the track by reaching and pulling a switch so that the ball flies off and crushes the cannon. The plan fails and the team gets confronted by Zeta and her guards, giving her a chance to fire the weapon. Mighty Eagle arrives and makes a desperate attempt to stop Zeta by apologizing to her for abandoning her. Zeta brushes him off, revealing his real name is Ethan and that her assistant Debbie is their daughter. While Zeta is distracted, Chuck ties up the weapon using Silver's new invention, a very strong string called Super-String, which catches and decelerates the lava balls after Zeta fires them. As the string breaks, the hatchlings, who managed to recover the eggs, along with some piglets who had joined them on their quest back home, pass by Eagle Island and help grasp the string. The lava balls slide back into the cannon, destroying it and the base. Everyone escapes, and Mighty Eagle protects Debbie from being crushed by a metal plate, redeeming himself to her and Zeta. 

Mighty Eagle and Zeta get married on Bird Island, with Red as the chief witness. Afterwards, Red credits Silver and the entire team for saving the islands, and as a result finds himself being even more beloved for his honesty and selflessness. While the rest of the birds, pigs, and eagles celebrate Zeta and Mighty Eagle's marriage, Silver and Red start a relationship. Meanwhile, when Zoe's eggs hatch, the hatchlings discover they have accidentally swapped their eggs with those of a boa constrictor after they mistook her eggs for theirs. They give them back to their mother, who has brought the newly-born sisters. However, as soon as the older hatchlings turn their eyes off them, the sisters stowaway onto the boa constrictor's boat, causing a cycle to repeat.

Voice cast

Production

Development 
A sequel to The Angry Birds Movie was announced in August 2016. It was directed by The Marvelous Misadventures of Flapjack and Home: Adventures with Tip & Oh creator Thurop Van Orman, co-directed by John Rice, and written by Peter Ackerman. John Cohen returned from The Angry Birds Movie to serve as producer, with animation again handled by Sony Pictures Imageworks. Imageworks' sister studio Sony Pictures Animation also released the film under their banner, despite having dropped out of co-producing the project beforehand and had not co-produced the first film either.

In the summer of 2017, production designer Pete Oswald stated that the sequel would be more of an adventure movie that introduces new characters and locations into the world first established in The Angry Birds Movie. While he was not in a position to offer further details about the plot and characters, which remained unknown until the months before the film's release, he expressed hope that it would be a better film than the first installment.

The creative decision to break from the games' source material and have the birds and pigs end their conflict and form an alliance to face a greater threat was one that was made out of a desire to surprise audiences with a new experience with the same characters, as well as attempt to outdo what was accomplished in the first film with an unprecedented level of creative freedom available. Josh Gad stated that the production team went forward with such idea because it was not only an "ingenious" one, but also because they felt it would feel most appropriate in light of the increasingly polarized political climate at the time, as people who disagree on significant issues struggle to find common ground.

Overall, the budget was approximately $65 million.

Casting 
In April 2018, the majority of the voice cast was announced. Jason Sudeikis, Gad, Danny McBride, Maya Rudolph, Bill Hader, and Peter Dinklage will reprise their roles from the first film. Leslie Jones will voice a new female villain, revealed to be Zeta in the teaser trailer. In December 2018, Nicki Minaj joined the cast of the film. Upon its release, the teaser trailer briefly revealed that Hal, a green boomerang bird from the games and the first film, will return in the sequel. Anthony Padilla would return to voice Hal. The following day, producer John Cohen announced in a tweet that Awkwafina will voice Courtney, the first named female pig in the Angry Birds franchise that briefly appeared in the teaser.

When the film's first full trailer was released on March 27, 2019, more details about the sequel's characters and their voice roles were revealed. Among several new characters confirmed to appear in the movie was Silver, a bird first introduced in the Angry Birds 2 game, voiced by Rachel Bloom, and Ella, voiced by Dove Cameron. In June, People revealed the identity of the white bird living with Zeta in the teaser trailer as Debbie, voiced by Tiffany Haddish who was one of several voice actors not listed in the initial casting. Later that month, the film's final trailer revealed that Terence, a large red bird from the first film, would appear without Sean Penn reprising his voice role, and Nolan North replacing Penn.

Animation 
Unlike the previous film, the sequel was co-produced with Rovio Animation and Sony Pictures Animation. While it was possible to reuse assets from the first film instead of starting from scratch, significant work was needed to make them compatible with new technological systems that were adopted in the past few years. The animators faced great challenges attempting to create more realistic feather systems for the Birds' plumage, even with the help of Sony Pictures Imageworks' existing feather system that was first used in Stuart Little (1999), especially when it came to designing the villain Zeta, the hardest character to animate in the film with over 1,000 controls, a very complex face structure and a tall, flexible torso. The team also faced a demanding task in designing visual effects for snow, ice, water and lava for the film and production was also affected by the unavailability of certain animators who were being used to complete Spider-Man: Into the Spider-Verse (2018) months prior, as well as the amount of time lost due to Sony moving the film's release date ahead by more than half a month.

Music 
Heitor Pereira, who previously composed the first film, returned to compose the score of The Angry Birds Movie 2. On July 25, 2019, Kesha released her song "Best Day" for the film as a single. Days later, Luke Combs released a song, "Let's Just Be Friends" for the film as a single as well. Both singles were played in the film's end credits.

Also included on the film was Giacomo Puccini's aria “Un bel di vedremo” from his opera Madama Butterfly. However this was credited as “Opera”, by Heitor Pereira in the soundtrack.

The film's soundtrack, titled The Angry Birds Movie 2: Original Motion Picture Soundtrack was released on August 9, 2019, only in digital format and is available to download through payment platforms. It includes two songs previously unreleased and original from the movie: Luke Combs' "Let's Just Be Friends" and Kesha's "Best Day (Angry Birds 2 Remix)". The rest of the album consists of a compilation of eighteen classical pop music hits from the 1960s to 2000s decades, in different genres and various artists.

Marketing 
As with the first film, Sony also attempted to connect the film to certain social causes while marketing it, leveraging the premise of the threat of worlds being frozen to call attention to urgent action on climate change and using Silver, who is depicted as a technical expert, as a model to inspire more young women to pursue STEM disciplines.

Video game 

A cooperative tie-in video game, The Angry Birds Movie 2 VR: Under Pressure, was released exclusively for the PlayStation 4's PlayStation VR system on August 6, 2019. The game takes place aboard the Piggy Gadget Lab that the main characters use to get to Eagle Island for the film's climatic confrontation.

Release

Theatrical 
The Angry Birds Movie 2 was theatrically released in the United States on August 14, 2019, coinciding with the 10th anniversary of the debut of the original Angry Birds game. The film was originally scheduled to be released on September 20, September 6, and August 16. It was released two weeks earlier on August 2 in the United Kingdom and Ireland. This was the final film from Sony Pictures Animation to have an exclusive theatrical release in the United States as several of its following movies were released by streaming services such as Netflix and Amazon Prime Video worldwide excluding China, where Sony still theatrically released the films. It was also the last film from SPA to be released in the 2010s.

The film's North American theatrical release was preceded by Hair Love (2019), a Kickstarter-funded campaign short film created by Matthew A. Cherry and Bruce W. Smith.

Home media 
The Angry Birds Movie 2 was released on digital and Movies Anywhere by Sony Pictures Home Entertainment on October 29, 2019, with Blu-ray, Ultra HD Blu-ray, and DVD releases following on November 12. All releases include an animated short film entitled Live Stream. The Ultra HD Blu-ray version was the first release of its kind to be IMAX enhanced.

Reception

Box office 
The Angry Birds Movie 2 has grossed $41.7 million in the United States and Canada, and $110.1 million in other territories, for a worldwide total of $152.8 million.

In the United States and Canada, the film was projected to gross $16–18 million from 3,800 theaters over its first six days of release. It made $2.6 million on its first day, ranking fifth and $1.7 million on its second. It ended up making $16.2 million over the six-day span (including an opening weekend of $10.6 million), finishing in fifth. It was less than a third of the first film's $38.1 million debut, and was blamed on the marketing making the sequel look the same as the first, as well as the crowded marketplace.

Critical response
 The website's critical consensus reads, "Like its non-aerodynamic title characters, The Angry Birds Movie 2 takes improbable yet delightfully entertaining flight, landing humorous hits along the way." According to Rotten Tomatoes, it was the best-reviewed film adaptation of a video game on their website and the highest score for an animated video game movie and is rated higher than the first film.  Audiences polled by CinemaScore gave the film an average grade of "B+" on an A+ to F scale, the same score earned by its predecessor, and PostTrak gave the film a 4 out of 5 stars and 72% "definite recommend" from parents and kids under 12.

Guy Lodge of Variety summarized his review with: "Perked up by some ingenious slapstick and Leslie Jones' inspired voice work, this gumball-bright sequel to 2016's game-based spinoff is another unexpected pleasure." Sandie Chen of Common Sense Media gave the film a three out of five stars stating, "Silly pranks, an ace voice cast, and a super-team mission storyline make this fast-paced sequel more fun than the original. It's a predictably well-intentioned second installment, in which the birds and pigs are forced to work together against an even more formidable foe. It also shows how Red's insecurity lingers, since he was only recently accepted and respected. Although some of the movie's jokes and sight gags are recycled (because, frankly, it's unlikely that little kids will ever get tired of naked piggy-butt jokes), the addition of the third mystery island is interesting enough to keep younger audiences guessing." Bob Hoose of Plugged In praised the humor, stating, "Surprisingly, the whole frenetic animated escapade ends up being pretty entertaining and funny. Even adults will, at some point, snort out an unexpected chortle." Simon Thompson of IGN gave the film a 6 out of 10 stating, "The Angry Birds Movie 2 does what you'd expect it to do, some nice touches move the franchise forward, but it could have dug deeper as some other franchises have. The whole is less than the sum of its parts, but those parts just about make the grade. Kids or a certain age will love it, and ultimately that's all that really matters here."

Accolades

See also 
 List of films based on video games

Notes

References

External links 

  at Sony Pictures
 
 

2010s American animated films
2010s children's comedy films
2019 comedy films
2019 computer-animated films
American children's animated comedy films
American computer-animated films
Angry Birds
Animated films about birds
Animated films based on video games
Columbia Pictures animated films
Columbia Pictures films
Films about pigs
Films directed by Thurop Van Orman
Films scored by Heitor Pereira
Films set on islands
Finnish adventure films
Finnish animated films
Finnish comedy films
Sony Pictures Animation films
2010s English-language films